Dropkick Murphys are an American Celtic punk band formed in Quincy, Massachusetts in 1996. Singer and bassist Ken Casey has been the band's only constant member.  Other current members include drummer Matt Kelly (1997– ), singer Al Barr (1998– ), guitarist James Lynch (2000– ), multi-instrumentalist Tim Brennan (2003– ) and multi-instrumentalist Jeff DaRosa (2007– ).

The band was initially signed to independent punk record label Hellcat Records, releasing five albums for the label, and building a reputation locally through constant touring and yearly St. Patrick's Day week shows, held in and around Boston. The 2004 single, "Tessie" became the band's first mainstream hit and one of their biggest charting singles to date.

The band's final Hellcat release, 2005's The Warrior's Code, included the song "I'm Shipping Up to Boston." The song was featured in the 2006 film The Departed, and went on to become the band's only platinum-selling single to date. It remains one of their best-known songs. The band is known for their loud, energetic live shows.

In 2007, the band began releasing music through their own imprint label, Born & Bred via Alternative Distribution Alliance. 2007's The Meanest of Times made its debut at No. 20 on the Billboard charts and featured the successful single, "The State of Massachusetts", while 2011's Going Out in Style was an even bigger success, making its debut at No. 6, giving the band their highest-charting album to date. The band's eighth studio album, Signed and Sealed in Blood was released in 2013 making its debut at No. 9 on the Billboard charts and featured the single "The Season's Upon Us", a Christmas song that was one of the band's highest-charting singles, and the single, "Rose Tattoo" which has become one of their most popular songs. The band's ninth album, 11 Short Stories of Pain & Glory, which was released on January 6, 2017,  debuted at number 8 on the Billboard charts and rose to number 2 on the charts. Their tenth album, Turn Up That Dial, was released on April 30, 2021. Their eleventh album, This Machine Still Kills Fascists, was released on September 30, 2022. Their twelfth album, Okemah Rising, will be released on May 12, 2023.

History

Mike McColgan era: 1996–1998
Dropkick Murphys were originally formed in 1996 in Quincy, Massachusetts, initially consisting of lead vocalist Mike McColgan, bassist/vocalist Ken Casey, guitarist Rick Barton, and drummer Jeff Erna (who would be replaced in the next year by Matt Kelly). The band was named after Dr. John "Dropkick" Murphy's alcohol-detoxification facility. The "Dropkick Murphys" first started playing in the basement of a friend's barbershop and soon began to tour and record. They received their first big break when the Mighty Mighty Bosstones selected them as the opening act for their 1997 tour in support of Let's Face It.

After putting out a series of EPs, they were signed by Hellcat Records in 1997. In 1998 they released their first full-length album, Do or Die, which was produced by Rancid's Lars Frederiksen.

Lead singer Mike McColgan left the band in 1998 during the middle of a US tour with the Business. According to McColgan, he wanted to follow in the footsteps of his uncle and join the Boston Fire Department, which he eventually would do in 2001. The band gave a different explanation for McColgan's departure in the liner notes of their 1998 7" release Curse of a Fallen Soul: "We'd like to take this time to officially let you know that Mike McColgan, our former lead singer has quit the band. We apologize to anyone who was a fan of Mike as our singer, however contrary to popular rumor, he did not leave the band to join the fire department. Mike left the band because he is no longer interested in being a member of this band or the movement of which we are a part." The band goes on to explain that their music is very serious to them and that it did not feel right having a singer who was going through the motions. Even Mike felt that the band deserved a singer who was emotionally invested in the music. Mike would later return to the punk scene in 2002 as singer of the Street Dogs.

Hellcat years: 1998–2007
 
Following McColgan's departure, the band searched for a replacement but did not have much luck. Al Barr, lead singer for the Bruisers was well aware of the Dropkick Murphys and at first actually resented the fact that the Dropkick Murphys were quickly becoming one of the biggest bands in the area, opening for all the bigger bands to come through, a slot Barr and the Bruisers would usually have obtained. Barr was informed of McColgan's departure and quickly assumed that the band was finished however he was contacted by Derek TC NYSR producer-founder of the groundbreaking 1990s Oi!-Skampilation series at the Middle East Club in Cambridge and informed to contact Ken Casey right away. Barr went in to audition for the band, first performing a new song titled "10 Years of Service" and was offered the job right away, which he accepted. Barr's first release with the band was the 1998 7" single for "Curse of a Fallen Soul".

On March 9, 1999, the band released their second studio album and first with Barr, The Gang's All Here. The album featured more of a hardcore–street punk sound closer to that of Barr's former band, the Bruisers and more of an Irish influence than on their debut album. The band gained their first mainstream exposure when the video for their single "10 Years of Service" received airplay on the MTV show 120 Minutes. The band set out on a year-long tour to support the album. In late 1999, the band along with the Business, released a split single titled, "Mob Mentality" in 1999. A year later they released a full-length album of the same name featuring the two bands covering each other's songs along with songs from other artists. Dropkick Murphys also re-recorded their own song "Boys on the Docks" with Al on vocals.

As the band began the process of recording their third album in 2000, Rick Barton decided to quit during the recording sessions. In 2014 Barton discussed his departure saying "Myself and Kenny ended up hating each other. We've since made amends, but you know, touring in a band for four straight years... that same old story." With Barton gone, the band added four new members which included former Ducky Boys guitarist James Lynch, who joined shortly prior to Barton's departure, 17-year-old guitarist Marc Orrell, mandolin and tin whistle player Ryan Foltz and bagpipe player Robbie "Spicy McHaggis" Mederios, whose nickname was inspired by a McDonald's menu item while the band was on a tour in Scotland, would join the band as their new full-time bagpipe player replacing Joe Delaney, who played on their debut album, but could not tour with or commit full-time to the band. With a new line-up in place, the band spent the rest of 2000 recording their third album.

Sing Loud, Sing Proud! was released on February 9, 2001. The album showcased the band's developing sound and new lineup (Rick Barton was featured on three of the album's tracks) and included collaborations with Pogues frontman Shane MacGowan and Cock Sparrer's Colin McFaull. The album would feature the singles and music videos for "The Spicy McHaggis Jig", "The Gauntlet" and a cover of "The Wild Rover" and also featured the Boston College fight song, "For Boston", which would go on to become one of the band's most performed show openers. The band would embark on one of their biggest tours at the time. In 2002, the band recorded three shows at the Avalon Ballroom during St. Patricks Day weekend, a weekend performance of shows in their hometown of Boston that would become an annual and must see event for the band and their fans. The result of these recording was the band's first live album, Live on St. Patrick's Day from Boston, MA which was released in September 2002.

In 2002, former lead singer, Mike McColgan formed the band Street Dogs. The first incarnation of the line-up would also feature Jeff Erna, the original drummer for the Dropkick Murphys. The band released their debut album, Savin Hill in 2003. The song, "Stand Up" featured guest appearances by Ken Casey and Al Barr. Casey was originally asked to produce the album however he was too busy with the Dropkick Murphys.

Following the Sing Loud, Sing Proud tour in early 2003, McHaggis decided to quit the band and was replaced by Canadian piper Scruffy Wallace. Foltz would depart soon after (though he made an appearance in the music video for "Gonna Be A Blackout Tonight", a song featured on the band's next record). Multi-instrumentalist, Tim Brennan was recruited to replace Foltz.

On June 10, 2003, the band's fourth album, Blackout, was released. The album included the minor radio hit "Walk Away", as well as the fan favorite song "Fields of Athenry". The band also re-recorded "The Dirty Glass". The song was previously released the prior year on Face to Face vs. Dropkick Murphys with Kay Hanley as a guest vocalist. The re-recorded version featured vocals from Stephanie Dougherty (Deadly Sins). Dougherty became an unofficial member of the band and would also join them on tour working their merchandise table until departing the band in 2009 (although she would return for random performances of the song following her departure). The song "Time To Go" was written about the Boston Bruins, and in November 2003 the band performed the song live at the TD Garden during intermission at a Bruins game. The song was also included on the soundtracks for the video games Tony Hawk's Underground and NHL 2005. Blackout also included a special bonus DVD with the music video for "Gonna Be A Blackout Tonight" along with two live clips filmed during the 2002 St. Patrick Day shows. It also featured the trailer for the band's then untitled upcoming DVD which would eventually be titled On the Road With the Dropkick Murphys and released in March 2004. The tour to support the album featured the band appearing on the 2003 Warped Tour. Tim Brennan was added to the lineup to play accordion making the Dropkick Murphys now a seven-piece band however shortly following the Warped Tour, Ryan Foltz, who was now basically a touring member as he didn't appear on the Blackout album, would quit the band.

For the 2004 baseball season the band released a re-working of a century-old Boston Red Sox fan anthem, "Tessie". "Tessie" was used in the major motion picture Fever Pitch and was included on the EA Sports video game MVP Baseball 2005 soundtrack.

The band was invited to the Fever Pitch premiere of the movie which was held at Fenway Park where the video was also shot. The song continues to be played at Red Sox games along with Dirty Water after games the team wins. In 2005, Dropkick Murphys released Singles Collection Volume 2, featuring covers, B-sides, and other material that didn't make it onto previous albums, and the band contributed a recording of "We Got the Power" to Rock Against Bush, Vol. 2, an outtake from the Blackout album.

Their fifth studio album and final album for Hellcat Records, The Warrior's Code, was released on June 21, 2005, and made its debut at number 49 on the album charts, which at the time was the highest debut for a Dropkick Murphys album. The album features the singles "Sunshine Highway" and "The Warrior's Code" as well as the bonus track "Tessie".

The Warrior's Code also featured a re-recorded version of "I'm Shipping Up to Boston", a song originally recorded for the band's "Fields of Athenry" single. The song featured lyrics from a Woody Guthrie poem the band found in his archives. The song was featured in the 2006 Academy Award-winning film The Departed, Martin Scorsese's adaptation of the Hong Kong crime thriller Infernal Affairs. Two videos, one with and one without footage from The Departed, were made due to overwhelming response to the song, which became one of the band's biggest hits to date and helped introduce Dropkick Murphys to an even bigger mainstream audience thanks to the film and soundtrack. The song was also used in The Simpsons episode "The Debarted". "I'm Shipping Up to Boston" became the walk-up song of Red Sox closer Jonathan Papelbon, who danced an Irish jig to the song several times throughout the 2007 Boston Red Sox Championship season. During the team's victory parade, Papelbon did the jig while the Murphys played the song on the same float. In 2012 the band said that since Papelbon signed with the Philadelphia Phillies, he could no longer use the song, as it was a "Boston song". They hoped the new Red Sox closer Andrew Bailey would use it, but both Bailey and his replacement, Koji Uehara, used different songs. Currently Washington Nationals' second baseman Daniel Murphy uses the song as he walks to the plate.

Independent success: 2007–present

In 2007, the band released The Meanest of Times on their own label, Born & Bred Records. The Meanest of Times debuted at No. 20 in the U.S., their highest chart debut to date. The first single, "The State of Massachusetts", became an instant hit and was used as the opening theme to the MTV show Nitro Circus; it reached No. 83 on the Rolling Stone Top 100 songs of 2007.

Guitarist Marc Orrell announced in January 2008 that he was leaving the band after eight years. Orrell said of his departure "I'm very grateful for everything playing with DKM has brought me and I'm sad to be going but I feel like the time has come for me to try working on different styles of music and some of my own projects, I'm ready to spread my wings as they say." Tim Brennan replaced Orrell as a full-time guitarist while multi-instrumentalist Jeff DaRosa was announced as a new member of the band. The re-configured line-up continued to tour into 2008, including a number of dates that July with the Mighty Mighty Bosstones. On July 10, 2008, the band performed at LeLacheur Park in Lowell, Massachusetts, where they announced that the show was being recorded and released as their next live album. Their show in Pawtucket, Rhode Island saw a sellout crowd of 10,060 which according to the band was their largest ever.

On April 22, 2009, the Dropkick Murphys joined Bruce Springsteen & the E Street Band on stage in Boston for his Working on a Dream Tour, playing "Glory Days" and "American Land". During the show, guitarist Tim Brennan proposed to his girlfriend Diana onstage, which was followed by a performance of the Springsteen song "So Young And in Love". The following month the band opened for Aerosmith at the Comcast Center in Mansfield, Massachusetts, in a "Hometown Heroes" concert; they later joined Aerosmith onstage to perform "Dirty Water".

On January 1, 2010, the band gave a performance of "I'm Shipping Up to Boston"  before the Boston Bruins–Philadelphia Flyers NHL Winter Classic, held at Boston's Fenway Park. Two months later on March 16, 2010, the band released their second live album, Live on Lansdowne, Boston MA. The album also featured the band's first full-length live DVD. The album made its debut at No. 25 in the U.S. charts, making it their second-highest-charting album at the time. Ken Casey gave an interview that same month to alt porn website Burning Angel announcing that the band would be hitting the studio in the summer or early fall of 2010 to record their next album.

In December 2010, "The Warrior's Code", the title track from the 2005 album of the same name, was briefly featured in the Academy Award-nominated film The Fighter. The film stars Mark Wahlberg, Christian Bale, and Amy Adams and tells the story of Micky Ward, a boxer from Lowell, Massachusetts, who also appears on the cover of The Warrior's Code and is the subject of the song. He became good friends with the band. "The Warrior's Code" was also featured in the trailer for the comedy Your Highness. The following year, "Barroom Hero" was featured in the Academy Award-nominated documentary Restrepo, making it the band's third song to be featured in an Oscar-nominated film. "

The band released their seventh studio album, Going Out in Style, on March 1, 2011. The album debuted at number 6 on the Billboard 200 – the highest position ever for a Dropkick Murphys album – and sold 43,259 copies in the U.S. in its first week. The album was produced by Ted Hutt, and features guest appearances by Bruce Springsteen, Fat Mike, Chris Cheney, and Lenny Clarke. The album's title track was released as the first single and the music video. A few weeks after the album's release, the band released the music video for the album's second single, "Memorial Day".

An extensive tour followed the release of Going Out in Style which included the Shamrock-N-Roll Festival in September 2011. The opening bands on that tour included Chuck Ragan, the Mahones, the Parkington Sisters, various local acts and boxer Mickey Ward giving boxing demonstrations. The co-headlining act on the nine-date tour was Mike McColgan's Street Dogs. This was the first time the two bands would tour together other than appearances on festival lineups such as the Warped Tour. McColgan joined his former band onstage for the first time in thirteen years for performances of such songs as "Barroom Hero" and "Far Way Coast" from Do or Die.

On December 23, 2011, it was announced on their website that the band had begun writing their eighth studio album and that following their 2012 St. Patrick's Day tour they would begin recording in April with hopes for the album to be released in September. The band released Going Out in Style: Fenway Park Bonus Edition on March 13, 2012. The release includes the full 2011 studio album along with an eighteen-track live album recorded at Fenway Park in 2011. The limited edition vinyl version contained two bonus live songs not on the CD.

On March 18, 2012, the band performed a very intimate show at Brighton Music Hall in the Allston section of Boston before a crowd of only 330. The show was 18 and over and special wristbands were sold at various locations in the area. The band performed 37 songs including the entire Do or Die album along with many older songs that hadn't been performed in several years. On March 20, 2012, the band released "Sunday Hardcore Matinee", the third single from Going Out in Style, as a limited-edition vinyl seven-inch of only 1,000 copies. The record's B-side is a live version of "Broken Hymns", which was not included on the Fenway Park live album.

At Download Festival 2012, the band announced they had finished their eighth studio album. During the band's summer 2012 dates, they had begun playing three new songs titled "Shark Attack", "Rose Tattoo" and "Road Rise". During their performance on July 1, 2012, Ken announced the new album would be out around the end of 2012. On August 24, 2012, the band announced on Facebook that their eighth studio album was complete and the title and artwork would be revealed the following week.

On August 31, 2012, it was announced via Dropkick Murphys' social network pages that the new album would be entitled Signed and Sealed in Blood and would be released on January 8, 2013. The album's title comes from the lyrics from the first single, "Rose Tattoo", which was released as a music video on November 7, 2012. "The Season's Upon Us" was released as the album's second single on December 18, 2012, and became one of the band's highest-charting singles. The album made its debut at number 9 on the charts giving the band their second straight top ten charting album and second highest-charting album to date. "The Boys Are Back" was released as the album's third single in January 2013. The album's fourth and final single, "Out of our Heads", was also used as the opening theme song for Boston's Finest, TNT's 2013 reality show about the Boston Police Department while "Prisoner's Song" was featured in commercials for Captain Morgan. A tour followed the album's release which included many television appearances to promote the album. The band performed their annual St. Patrick's Day tour in 2013, which culminated in the band performing at their largest headlining show to date, held in the U.S. at TD Garden in Boston.

Former founding Dropkick Murphys members Mike McColgan and Rick Barton formed the group FM359 in early 2013; this was the first time McColgan and Barton had worked together in over fifteen years since McColgan quit the Dropkick Murphys in 1998. Their debut album, Truth, Love and Liberty, was released in January 2014.

The band kicked off the Celtic Invasion Tour in March 2015, which ended with five shows at the House of Blues in Boston for their annual St. Patrick Day performances. In October 2014, the band gave a special nine-song performance aboard the USS Constitution during its final voyage of 2014 and in honor of the historic ship's 217th birthday.

Following the band's performance on November 16, 2014, in San Antonio, Texas, the band was headed to Tulsa, Oklahoma, for their next performance. They also made a stop in Dallas, Texas, to take Al Barr to the airport so he could fly home to attend the funeral of a close friend. Just north of Austin, Texas, the band's tour bus was involved in a fatal accident when a pedestrian suddenly ran onto the highway in front of the bus, in what is believed by police to be a suicide. Ken Casey stated that "the band is pretty shaken up and don't want to talk about the situation, especially since they don't even know if the family has been notified yet". The band's bus was badly damaged and their driver was too upset over the tragedy, leading the band to cancel their Tulsa performance. The two acts scheduled to open for the band gave a free show for the fans in Tulsa at a different venue.

In 2015, Ken Casey started Murphys Boxing promotion and served as a corner man for boxers such as Danny O'Connor (once ranked one of the top 15 boxers in the world) and Spike O'Sullivan.

On January 21, 2015, the band announced on their Facebook page that at the annual Punk Rock Bowling and Music Festival in Las Vegas in May 2015 they would perform Do or Die in its entirety. They also announced that they are currently writing new music for the next album.

On June 22, 2015, the band announced on Facebook that after a hiatus from the band, they had parted ways with Josh "Scruffy" Wallace after twelve years with the band, stating "We wish Josh and his family all the best going forward and thank him for his time with us." Wallace would join the Mahones in early 2016. Lee Forshner replaced Wallace as the band's touring and recording bagpipe player although he is not considered an official member of the band.

On September 9, 2015, the band was invited by the New England Patriots to perform at their opening game at Gillette Stadium before they took the field.

In November 2015, the band announced plans for their annual St. Patrick's Day tour in 2016 which also marks the band's 20th anniversary. On this tour the Dropkick Murphys announced that they are going to record a new album in May 2016, which will include a cover version of "You'll Never Walk Alone". They also premiered two new songs called "The Ghosts of Rock'n'Roll" and "Sandlot". The band is currently working on their next album in El Paso, TX which is expected to be released around November 2016 to January 2017 according to Casey. On October 4, 2016, Ken Casey announced that the band would release two new albums in 2017. "One more show left in 2016 then on to a big 2017 with lots of touring and 2 new records!!!!". The show featured Mark Geanakakis on drums of Boston Street Punk Band Who Killed Spikey Jacket? and Canadian Punk band ZEX, as their drummer missed his flight and needed a last minute replacement.

Ken Casey appears in a small role in the 2016 film Patriots Day which is based on 2013 Boston Marathon bombing and the subsequent terrorist manhunt. The Dropkick Murphys' Forever (2007 version) also plays during the end credits of the film.

After announcing its release in November 2016, the band released their ninth studio album 11 Short Stories of Pain & Glory on January 6, 2017. The album was preceded by the singles "Blood", "You'll Never Walk Alone" and "Paying My Way". The album's release was followed by promotional dates and a tour that concluded in March 2017 with the band's annual St. Patrick's Day shows in Boston. A more extensive world-tour followed which included the "From Boston to Berkeley Tour" with Rancid from late July to late August 2017 in North America in which both bands co-headlined and shared the stage at the end of the show.

In a June 2017 interview, drummer Matt Kelly said that the band hoped to put the finishing touches on the follow-up to 11 Short Stories of Pain & Glory following their summer tour with Rancid and they hoped to release the album, their tenth, in 2018.

In 2018, Ken Casey was involved in a motorcycle accident and suffered severe damage to a vertebral disc which required surgery in May 2018 and caused him to lose feeling in his fingers and has forced him to be unable to play the bass. The band was unsure if Casey would be able to begin their 2018 summer tour due to the injury. However, Kevin Rheault, the band's longtime stage tech and who filled in for other band members in the past, filled in on bass and has remained since. During a St. Patrick's Day show at the House of Blues on March 17, 2019, Casey attempted to defend fans that were being attacked by another concert-goer. He was hit in the head by a beer can, causing blood to appear on his face, though he stayed on stage and finished the concert while the involved fan was escorted from the building.

On January 21, 2020, the band announced that they would release two new songs, "Smash Shit Up" and "The Bonny" on 12" and for digital download on January 31, 2020. Ken Casey said that the band's next album would be out in August or September 2020 and that they will be releasing a series of songs up to that point.

Owing to the 2020 coronavirus pandemic, the band postponed their annual St. Patrick's Day shows until September. However, thanks to Cambridge, Massachusetts based software company Pegasystems, they performed a special free live streaming show titled Streaming Up to Boston in Derry, New Hampshire at Studio Lab/Events United, on March 17, 2020, where they also previewed three songs from their upcoming album, including "Mick Jones Nicked My Pudding", "Queen of Suffolk County" and "Burn it to the Ground". "The days leading up to the St. Patrick's Day shows when people are asking you 'Are the shows still happening?!' and you don't know -- we ultimately pulled the plug before it was a mandatory thing because we felt it was the right thing to do." Ken Casey said. Casey also discussed how the rollout of new songs had possibly changed, saying "We started the process with releasing a two song single last month, and there was supposed to be another one in May, and another sometime in the summer, so we'd be teasing part of the album leading up to September -- but who knows if those are gonna happen now at this point, the way things are going. We said, 'While we work all that out, let's just play the goddamn songs.'" Casey also said the band financially would take a hit due to their shows being postponed. "[We have] zero insurance. We don't even carry cancelation insurance on our shows. We've been through this a few times before with festivals that were canceled because of hurricanes or storms. The cost of a band of our size, we'd be paying a third of our guarantee for every show for insurance. You gotta roll the dice at that point.""Streaming Up to Boston" drew an audience of more than 13 million viewers and raised over $60,000 for the Boston Resiliency Fund, a nonprofit that provides essential services to Boston residents—including first responders and critical care providers amid the pandemic.

On March 21, 2020, the band released the digital single "Mick Jones Nicked My Pudding" as an exclusive download through their website. The single features the b-side "James Connolly". Fans could pay what they wanted from $2 up to a $50 option, that featured a video shout-out from the band, or to a $100 option that would feature a "Roast Your Buddy" video by the band.

The band announced that their still to be titled tenth studio album will be released on September 11, 2020.

On May 18, 2020, the band announced on their Facebook page that they would be live streaming a full no audience concert titled Streaming Outta Fenway at Fenway Park in Boston on May 29, 2020, which again would be sponsored by Pegasystems. The performance featured a special appearance by Bruce Springsteen who appeared remotely and performed two songs with the band. The event marked the first music performance without an in-person audience at a major U.S. arena, stadium or ballpark. During the livestream, viewers were encouraged to donate to three charities: the Boston Resiliency Fund, Feeding America, and Habitat for Humanity, Greater Boston. Prior to the performance, the music video for "Mick Jones Nicked My Pudding" was shown. The 2 hour show attracted over 9 million viewers and raised over $700,000 (with Pegasystems donating the first $151,000).

On June 6, 2020, it was announced that the band reached a six-figure deal with Pegasystems, the software company who sponsored the band's two livestreaming shows. Pegasystems agreed to financially back all of the band's in-person shows in Boston as well as a St. Patrick's Day livestream for the next three years. The band's manager Jeff Castelaz said the six-figure partnership includes an up-front payment to support the band's 10-person road crew, to help make up for the sudden loss of the crew's income with the end of live touring. Ken Casey said the only revenue for the band came from online merchandise sales during the two live streaming shows and that the future remains uncertain for rock bands and that he doesn't necessarily see the financial sense in touring for crowds at venues that can only be half full, after they finally do reopen."

On August 21, 2020, the band (consisting of just Ken, James, Tim and some other guy), gave an acoustic performance of Tommy Gun by The Clash during an online live stream 68th birthday tribute to Joe Strummer called A Song for Joe: Celebrating the Life of Joe Strummer. On August 22, 2020, the band will perform a special virtual live streaming acoustic set on Facebook in support of Joe Kennedy III and his run for U.S. Senate.

The band announced that for a second year in a row due to COVID-19 restrictions they will be performing a free live stream concert online. St. Patrick's Day Live Stream 2021...Still Locked Down will take place on March 17, 2021. Instead of charging a fee to view the performance, the band is encouraging fans to donate to help out paying their crew and other expenses.

On February 23, 2021, the band released the single, "Middle Finger" and announced that their tenth album, Turn Up That Dial, would be released on April 30, 2021. The album's fifth single, "Queen of Suffolk County" was released on March 31, 2021, with a music video to be released on April 15, 2021. On May 1, 2021, the band held a record release party livestream where they performed Turn Up That Dial in its entirety along with other songs from previous albums. The band also announced that they would tour in support of the album beginning with their Boston to Berkeley II North America co-headling tour with Rancid from August to October 2021 
followed by a European tour from January to February 2022 also scheduled.

In February 2022 it was announced that Al Barr was forced to drop off of the band's 2022 St. Patrick's Day Tour and their 2022 summer tour in Europe to take care of his ailing mother who is battling Lewy Body Dementia. Jesse Ahern, Mikey Rivkees of The Rumjacks, and Jen Razavi of The Bombpops will be assisting on vocals for certain songs in place of Barr with Ken Casey taking over other vocal duities for Barr. That same month, Campbell Webster joined the band as their touring bagpipe player. His first recording with the band was a cover of "We Shall Overcome".

On June 21, 2022, the band announced that they would be releasing their eleventh album, This Machine Still Kills Fascists, on September 30, 2022. The album is the band's first since their 1998 debut album Do or Die to not feature singer Al Barr who is currently on hiatus from the band dealing with his ailing mother. The album will be the band's first acoustic album and will feature ten songs with unused lyrics written by Woody Guthrie. The album was preceded by the single "Two 6's Upside Down" on July 6 and the band embarked on an acoustic theater tour in the fall of 2022 to support the album.The band will release their twelfth album, Okemah Rising, on May 12, 2023. The album was recorded during the same sessions for This Machine Still Kills Facists and like that album will feature songs using the unused lyrics by Woody Guthrie.The album was preceeded by the single "I Know How it Feels" on March 1, 2023.

Musical style and influences
The band's early influences were punk bands like Greenland Whalefishers, Swingin' Utters, the Ramones, the Clash, and Sex Pistols, as well as the Pogues and Irish bands such as Stiff Little Fingers and the Dubliners.

When they wrote their first song, Barroom Hero, they were surprised to hear how much the vocal melody sounded like those from old Irish music they heard as children, something the band-members at one time tried to reject. "It dawned on us that Irish music was a bigger influence on all of us than we'd realized," said Ken Casey. "Growing up in Boston, every time you went to a wedding or a wake or your grandparents' house, you heard that music. I went through a phase of hating it just because it's what my (folks) listened to."

While frequently referred to as a Celtic punk band, some of their earlier material has also been classified under other punk rock subgenres like Oi!, street punk and hardcore punk.

They frequently cite AC/DC as an influence on their formula of maintaining a specific style, with Casey once saying "I think our goal is to be the AC/DC of Celtic punk rock. The worst thing we can do to the local fans who have stuck with us is to all of a sudden try to be Fall Out Boy with bagpipes." Al Barr commented "We've always said we're like the Ramones or AC/DC with what we do; if it ain't broke, don't fix it. But at the same time, we have to keep challenging ourselves. And if we find that tunes we're putting together for a record are boring us, we're not going to record them."

Political causes and charity work

Union support 
The Dropkick Murphys have been known for supporting working class and union causes, and have a strong relationship with the AFL–CIO. All of the shirts sold by the band are 100% union made in the United States to show their support for American laborers. 

The band shot a promotional music video in 2008 for their song, "Tomorrow's Industry" which supported the United Healthcare Workers East and hospitals of Massachusetts who were fighting for free and fair union elections so their voice could be heard in the workplace and would provide a better future for their families and communities.

On February 22, 2011, in support of Wisconsin workers' rights, the band released their song "Take 'Em Down" from the album "Going Out in Style" on their website along with creating a limited edition "Take 'Em Down" T-shirt which will benefit the Workers' Rights Emergency Response Fund. Two days later on the MSNBC news show the Last Word with Lawrence O'Donnell, "Take 'Em Down" was used as an intro song to a news story on the Wisconsin workers protest.

On Saturday August 13, 2011, Dropkick Murphys issued a statement of solidarity with the 45,000 Communications Workers of America (CWA) and International Brotherhood of Electrical Workers (IBEW) on strike from Verizon Communications, Inc.

The band shot a music video in collaboration with the National Union of Rail, Maritime and Transport Workers to show their support for the many strikes occurring across the United Kingdom since May 2022, on February 14, 2023.

Politics 
The band has said that they are all Democrats, and during the 2004 United States presidential election were part of Punkvoter, a political activist group dedicated to defeating George W. Bush. That year they also appeared on the Rock Against Bush, Vol. 2 compilation contributing the song "We Got the Power".

In November 2014, an 18-year-old was arrested for assaulting two Lancaster, Pennsylvania police officers (one being a female, who needed to be hospitalized). During the assault the teen screamed out "Dropkick Murphys". A few days following the incident, Ken Casey called the police chief to offer his condolences and apologized for the fan's actions. Casey also sent the officers a UPS package full of shirts, hats and other band garb along with tickets to their show. When asked if the officers would wear the band's gear the police chief joked "probably to court". The police chief wasn't familiar with the band prior to the incident but his officers, including the two assaulted, were. The teen was charged with two counts of felony aggravated assault and misdemeanor counts of resisting arrest and possessing drug paraphernalia. He was released on $40,000 bail.

In January 2015, Republican governor of Wisconsin Scott Walker used the band's song "I'm Shipping Up to Boston" when he took to the stage at the Iowa Freedom Summit. The band, who strongly opposes the political views of Walker, posted on their Twitter page "please stop using our music in any way...we literally hate you !!! Love, Dropkick Murphys". This wasn't the first time the song was used by a Republican politician. Wisconsin State Rep and Speaker of the State Assembly Jeff Fitzgerald used the song to which the band replied: "The stupidity and irony of this is laughable. A Wisconsin Republican U.S. Senate candidate and crony of anti-Union Governor Scott Walker using a Dropkick Murphys song as an intro is like a white supremacist coming out to gangsta rap! Fitzgerald: if you and your staff can't even figure out your music you might wanna give up on the politics!!!!! We stand beside our Union and Labor brothers and sisters and their families in Wisconsin and all over the U.S!" The band's comments towards Walker gained national media exposure with those in the left-wing media defending the band and those in the right- wing media condemning the band for their comments. The band released a full statement on the issue saying: "The bottom line is: when a politician uses our music to walk out to, for better or worse, it brands us with that person. If one of our favorite teams' rivals, such as the Montreal Canadiens, used a Dropkick Murphys song when they took the ice, we'd be equally displeased. We feel that we have the right to ask to not be associated with certain events or people – we don't think that's too much to ask. This isn't a legal issue to us—we're not looking to sue someone. Yes, our words were a little harsh, but it was borne out of frustration with the past history of Wisconsin Republicans, such as Jeff Fitzgerald, using our music. The band has stood for and aligned itself with certain principles since its inception in 1996, so people who react as though we're jumping on some sort of political bandwagon simply don't know the history of the band. We are what we are, we believe what we believe—and for the most part, try to leave our politics to our lyrics."

Opiate addiction plays a big role on the band's ninth album 11 Short Stories of Pain & Glory. The band wanted to bring more attention to this epidemic in America and the lives being lost to drugs. Songs like "Paying My Way" and especially "You'll Never Walk Alone" were recorded in response. "As you may know, opiate overdoses are an epidemic in America now particularly in this area. I've been to thirty wakes in two years, three this week, one being my cousin, Al's lost a brother in law. It's hit home close to us. I was leaving one of the wakes and this song ("You'll Never Walk Alone") came on and as I was listening to the lyrics it summed up exactly how I was feeling. Sad but knowing there is hope. You never have to be alone. I hope you like our version" Casey said. The album also featured "4-15-13", a tribute to the lives lost and affected by the Boston Marathon bombing.

In January 2017, guitarist Tim Brennan was asked about the band's longtime support for unions and workers' rights and the possible effect President Donald Trump will have. "Who fucking knows what's going to become of the country when the Trump administration is in full swing and everything. All we can do is continue to do what we do. ... But that's something that's always been close to the heart of the band and we always will continue to support. So if something comes up where we need to pay specific attention to that, we're gonna do it." Brennan said. Brennan was also asked about Donald Trump and his ties to White Nationalism, if there was concern of that being brought into their shows such as an incident at one of the band's shows involving a guy that came onstage and was Nazi saluting, resulting in Ken Casey tackling him. Brennan said "You know, I don't think we are. We're certainly not thinking about it at the moment. Hopefully that's not something that ends up happening because of the election or anything like that. But I think we've tried to make it fairly clear over the last 20 years that while we love everyone coming to our shows and we love our fans, people like that are not welcome at our shows. Period."

In January 2017 drummer Matt Kelly discussed the 2016 presidential election and the band's political views of Donald Trump saying, "I was opposed to both Mr. Trump and Mrs. Clinton and voted for neither of them; I voted for Gary Johnson. If the Democrats continued to hold executive office, there'd be no outcry against the countless drone strikes, missile strikes, or sending troops to fight endless wars in the Middle East. So far, the people so critical of G.W. Bush foolish warmongering turn a blind eye to the horrors perpetrated under Mr. Obama's watch". Kelly however remained optimistic that Donald Trump could be a good president saying "With Trump, I honestly don't know. I certainly don't think he has the moral fibre to be POTUS, but time will tell. I hope and pray that he is smarter than he's letting on! He seems to be the "bull in the china shop" type. If he brings more middle-class jobs to America and tries to rid us of the draconian National Defense Authorization Act, that would be a big thumbs-up from me but I highly doubt he'll even touch that but then again, what does he have to lose? He's not a career politician! Time will tell." Al Barr in a 2017 interview discussed his views on the 2016 election and the band's political stance by saying "I was a Bernie Sanders guy, and when (Donald) Trump won, I wasn't surprised at all. I remember early on listening to a non-partisan person say that Bernie would win if he could get a foot forward, and Trump would win if he couldn't. And that's exactly what happened. And I'll say that I don't think we would have been any better off with a Hillary Clinton presidency. I think that she is an evil woman. I don't think she had the people's best interest at heart. My heart was broken early on when the DNC (Democratic National Committee) stole the election from him (Sanders), which was proven. This is coming from a former Democrat. I'm an Independent as a result of this election. I feel like I expected more from the party I was once a part of. I really don't look at myself as an activist. I think that what we do as a band isn't that. You're coming to see Dropkick Murphys, not get political speeches and get moved. Our music speaks for itself and always has. You know that we're pro-union, we're anti-racism, we're backing the working man. When you go to an Anti-Flag or Dead Kennedys show, that's their thing, and you expect that. We stand up for what we feel is right or wrong and always have. We've never been the band that is trying to feed you from the stage with our own personal beliefs. When I go to see band, I want to forget about my troubles and what's going on in the world and have a good time.

In February 2020, drummer Matt Kelly was asked about President Donald Trump, the current state of America and said "Employment is up, so that's good ... and that's about it ... screw him and his opponents on the other side of the aisle. They're like a bunch of quarrelling children. Embarrassing."

In August 2020, the band announced that they were supporting Joe Kennedy III for U.S. Senate.

In a March 6, 2021 interview with the Boston Herald, Ken Casey discussed the band's tenth album, Turn Up That Dial, and the inspiration behind some of the album's songs. One of the songs, "Chosen Few", takes jabs at former President Donald Trump and his mishandling of the COVID-19 pandemic. Casey said that while he hated Trump, this would be the only song to focus on the former president as he felt Trump dominated the news too much in the four years he was president and he didn't want him to dominate their album.

In an April 29, 2021 interview, Ken Casey was asked how he celebrated Trump's election loss and the impact it had on their 2021 album Turn Up That Dial saying ""I haven't had a drink or drug for thirty years, next Wednesday actually, so it wasn't with alcohol. I celebrated Trump losing by my blood pressure coming down! This could easily have been a "screw you, Donald Trump" record but he's sucked enough life out of me, he's not getting any more! Even before the pandemic, the idea behind this album was 'here's to better times.' I have best friends who grew up blue collar Boston Irish, which means Democrat, who've been swindled by this snake oil salesman's lies. People have family members they're not talking to because of this; it's done terrible things to relationships in America. The guy craves attention so my attitude is let's not speak his name. Be wary that this doesn't happen again but at the same time don't talk about him."

On June 24, 2021, Ken Casey along with music artists Dionne Warwick, Sam Moore and Corey Glover appeared in Washington, D.C. at the U.S. Capitol alongside congressmen Ted Deutch and Darrell Issa to help introduce the American Music Fairness Act which would help music performers and recorded-music copyright owners to be paid for airplay on of their songs AM/FM radio stations. The United States currently is the only major country in the world where radio pays no royalties to the performer or copyright owner and only to the songwriter of the song. "I'm a punk rocker! We don't even want to be played on the radio, but I'm here in support of my fellow musicians. When other people are making millions and billions, well, I think the trickle down should be a little more equitable," Casey said.

On March 23, 2022, the band got into a social media feud on Twitter with a local Massachusetts Neo-Nazi group called the Nationalist Social Club who used their song "The Boys Are Back" in a promotional video. "F***** Losers. Stop using our song for your little dress up party video. We will SMASH you" the band's social media post read. These interactions came in the midst of the local Neo-Nazi group attending and attempting to take over a local St. Patrick's Day parade in Boston. This was met with a protest rally on March 26, 2022, being held against the hate group though the band had no involvement in the protest rally.

In February 2023, the band released a music video for the song "All You Tories" which was a re-working of the Woody Guthrie song "All You Fonies (Bound to Lose)" that the band covered on their 2022 album This Machine Still Kills Fascists. "In support of all our Union friends in the UK fighting the good fight against the elitist Tory political party we made this music video in association with the RMT (The National Union of Rail, Maritime and Transport Workers). On our recent UK shows we changed the words to the song "All You Fonies (Bound To Lose)" to "All You Tories" in support of the striking railroad and transit workers, nurses , fire fighters, teachers, postal workers, ambulance staff and health workers. Yours in Solidarity, Dropkick Murphys" the band said in a statement that was released with the video.

Support for veterans and deceased soldiers 
In 2005, the band released a two-song CD single for the family of Andrew K. Farrar, Jr., a sergeant in the U.S. Marine Corps who was killed on January 28, 2005, in Al Anbar, Iraq, during Operation Iraqi Freedom. Farrar, who was a big fan of the Murphys, made a request to his family that if he did not survive his tour of duty, he wanted "The Fields of Athenry" to be played at his funeral. The single features a slower version of "The Fields of Athenry" that was originally recorded and placed in Farrar's casket, although the band decided to release the alternate version. The disc also features the track "Last Letter Home", which was written about Farrar and was featured on the Murphys' 2005 album The Warrior's Code. All of the proceeds from the $10 single go to the Sgt. Andrew Farrar Memorial Fund and can be purchased through the band's website or at one of their shows.

On October 19, 2014, the band played a special surprise performance at the memorial ceremony for Maj. Michael Donahue, who was from Whitman, Massachusetts, and was killed during combat in Afghanistan the previous month. Donahue was a huge fan of the band and they closed out the ceremony which included a performance of his favorite song, "The Green Fields of France".

Charity 
In 2009, Ken Casey founded the charity organization, the Claddagh Fund which supports community-based non-profits with a focus on children and veterans organizations and programs that support alcohol and drug rehabilitation in cities across the country and around the world. In 2011, the band donated $1 from every ticket sold on their nine date Sham Rock-N-Roll Festival to the Claddagh Fund. $1 from every ticket sold at the show of September 11 in Altamont, New York, on that tour was donated to various 9/11 charities.

Following the aftermath of the Boston Marathon bombing, the Dropkick Murphys created a special "For Boston" T-shirt they sold through their website with all donations going to the victims. The donations reached $65,000 in less than 15 hours and totaled over $100,000. The band also will donate all money from sales from a special three song charity EP titled Rose Tattoo: For Boston Charity EP through iTunes featuring a re-recorded version of their song, "Rose Tattoo" with guest vocals by Bruce Springsteen. Springsteen contacted the band following the tragic events asking if there was anything he could do to help. The band also played benefit shows where all money was donated to the victims including the four who lost their lives.

In December 2015, the band announced they were teaming up with the Pablove Foundation, a group which invests in underfunded, cutting-edge pediatric cancer research, inspires cancer families through education, and improves the lives of children living with cancer through the arts. The band released an exclusive T-shirt which was available for only four days with 100% of the proceeds donated to the Pablove Foundation.

In January 2018, the band teamed up with Devin McCourty of the New England Patriots on a raffle raising money for the Dropkick Murphys' Claddagh Fund and McCourty's Embrace the Kids Foundation. The grand prize includes a trip and tickets to Super Bowl LII.

In November 2019, the band performed at a charity event for Worcester, MA firefighter Lt. Jason Menard, who lost his life after rescuing his crew from a house fire in the Central Massachusetts city. The band also sold a benefit tee shirt as a fundraiser for his family.

On May 20, 2016, the Dropkick Murphys received the "Robert F. Kennedy Children's Action Corps' Embracing the Legacy Award" for years of charity work with various organizations including work with children and military veteran. The award, "which parallels Robert F. Kennedy's quest for social justice on behalf of society's most vulnerable people" was presented to the band at the Kennedy Library.

Following the 2022 Russian invasion of Ukraine, the Dropkick Murphys teamed up with the O'Hamsters, a Ukrainian Celtic punk band, to release a Ukrainian version of We Shall Overcome, with the O'Hamsters singing lead vocals, and the Dropkick Murphys playing the music and performing backup vocals. The video featured artwork from various Ukrainian artists and links to various charities supporting the war effort.

Band members

Current members
 Ken Casey – lead vocals , bass, backing vocals 
 Matt Kelly – drums, bodhrán, backing vocals 
 Al Barr – lead vocals  (on hiatus from the band in 2022 to deal with family issues)
 James Lynch – rhythm guitar, backing vocals 
 Tim Brennan – lead guitar, accordion, keyboard, backing vocals , mandolin, bouzouki,banjo keyboard, piano, backing vocals 
 Jeff DaRosa – banjo, mandolin, bouzouki, guitar, keyboard, piano, harmonica, tin whistle, backing vocals

Current touring musicians
 Kevin Rheault – lead guitar , bass guitar 
 Campbell Webster - bagpipes, tin whistle

Former members
 Jeff Erna – drums 
 Mike McColgan – lead vocals 
 Rick Barton – guitars 
 Spicy McHaggis  – bagpipes 
 Ryan Foltz – mandolin, tin whistle 
 Marc Orrell – lead guitar, accordion, piano 
 Scruffy Wallace – bagpipes, tin whistle 
 Lee Forshner – bagpipes

Former touring musicians
 Joe Delaney – bagpipes 
 Stephanie Dougherty – vocals

Timeline

Discography

Studio albums
 Do or Die (1998)
 The Gang's All Here (1999)
 Sing Loud, Sing Proud! (2001)
 Blackout (2003)
 The Warrior's Code (2005)
 The Meanest of Times (2007)
 Going Out in Style (2011)
 Signed and Sealed in Blood (2013)
 11 Short Stories of Pain & Glory (2017)
 Turn Up That Dial (2021)
 This Machine Still Kills Fascists (2022)
 Okemah Rising (2023)

References

Further reading 
 Herwick, Edgar B., III, "Interview with Al Barr", Front Row Boston, transcript, WGBH, aired July 5, 2014.

External links

 

 
1996 establishments in Massachusetts
Celtic punk groups
Hellcat Records artists
Irish-American culture in Massachusetts
Musical groups established in 1996
Musical groups from Boston
Punk rock groups from Massachusetts
American punk rock groups
Let Them Eat Vinyl artists